Bruno Van Peteghem (born in New Caledonia) was awarded the Goldman Environmental Prize in 2001, for his campaign to place the island's coral reef (among the world's largest and most unusual) on UNESCO's World Heritage List in order to protect the reef against destruction from nickel mining industries.

References

New Caledonian environmentalists
Living people
Year of birth missing (living people)
Place of birth missing (living people)
Goldman Environmental Prize awardees